Shia hadith scholars are people who have quoted hadith from Shia Imams directly or indirectly through intermediary, and their biographies are found in the books of scholars of rijal (Biographical evaluation) science, such as Ikhtiar Marifat al-Rijal, Fehrist Asma' Musannifi al-Shia, Ae'yan ol-Shia, Moe'jamo Rijal el-Hadith and Az-Zaree'a books. The basis for categorization in this list is the time of death of each person.

1st century AH narrators
1st century AH (622 CE – 719 CE):

 Abu Rafe'
 Sulaym ibn Qays
 Ali ibn Abi Rafe'
 Kumayl ibn Ziyad
 Rabi'at ibn Sami'e

2nd century AH narrators
2nd century AH (719 CE – 816 CE):

 Abu Hamza al-Thumali
 Ja'far ibn Muhammad ibn Sharih Hazrami
 Omar ibn Udhayna
 Aban ibn Abi Ayyash
 Asem ibn Homayd el-Hannat
 Zayd ol-Zarad
 Zayd ol-Narsi

Fourth stratum: Companions of Muhammad al-Baqir and Ja'far al-Sadiq
Muhammad al-Baqir was the fifth Imam in Shia Islam, Ja'far al-Sadiq was the 6th Imam and founder of the Ja'fari school of jurisprudence according to Twelver and Isma'ili Shi'ites.

 Zurarah ibn A'yun (trustworthy and from the Consensus companions)
 Muhammad bin Muslim (trustworthy and from the Consensus companions)
 Burayd ibn Mu'awiya al-'Ijli (trustworthy and from the Consensus companions)
 Abu Basir Laith ibn Bakhtari Moradi (trustworthy and from the Consensus companions)
 Fozayl ibn Yassar (trustworthy and from the Consensus companions)
 Marouf ibn Kharrabouz (trustworthy and from the Consensus companions)
 Aban ibn Taghlib
 Ziad ibn Isa ibn Obaideh al-Haza'
 Bokayr ibn A'yan
 Homarn ibn A'yan
 Mohammad ibn Qayse Bajli
 Ismail ibn Abdorrahman Jo'fi
 Abu Basir Asadi
 Jabir ibn Yazid al-Ju'fi
 Soleiman ibn Khaled Aqta'

3rd century AH narrators
3rd century AH (816 CE – 913 CE):

 Ahmad ibn Abi Nasr Bazanti
 Al-Fadl ibn Shadhan
 Sa'd ibn Abdullah Ash'ari

4th century AH narrators
4th century AH (913 CE – 1009 CE):

 Abu Muhammad al-Hasan ibn Musa al-Nawbakhti
 Muhammad ibn Jarir al-Tabari
 Muhammad ibn Ya'qub al-Kulayni
 Muhammad Ibn Ibrahim Ibn Jafar al-Numani
 Abu Ja'far Muhammad ibn 'Ali ibn Babawayh al-Qummi

See also
 The science of rijal
 Timeline of Islamic history
 List of expeditions of Muhammad
 Quranic timeline
 Zakaria ibn Idris Ash'ari Qomi

References

External links
 Thiqa (trustworthy)
 The science of rijal
 The Science of Rijal as a Method in the Study of Hadith
 ilm al-Rijal (Science of Men)
 List of the Companions of Imam al-Sadiq (a)
 List of the Companions of Imam al-Baqir (a)

 
Lists of Muslims